Thanthaikku Pin Thamaiyan is a 1960 Indian Tamil language film directed by G. R. Rao. The film stars T. R. Mahalingam and Pandari Bai.

Plot

Cast 
Cast according to the songbook:

Actors
 T. R. Mahalingam as Mathivanan
 T. K. Ramachandran as Thillaiyambalam
 N. N. Kannappa as Gunaseelan
 D. Balasubramanyam as Sundaram Pillai
 Kaka, Radhakrishnan as Ezhusuthu
 E. R. Sahadevan as Karunanyam Pillai
 O. A. K. Thevar as Kathirvelu Pillai
Guest Artistes
 S. V. Sahasranamam as Judge
 Mynavathi as Mathivathani
 K. Malathi as Mother's Association President

Female cast
 Pandari Bai as Chandra
 C. K. Saraswathi as Kanakavalli
 D. Kamini as Rani
 C. D. Vanaja as Pankajam
 Manorama as Patharai Mathu
 S. M. Saroja as Naluveli

Production 
The film was produced by M. M. A. Subbaiah Thevar, brother of Sandow M. M. A. Chinnappa Thevar under the banner Surya Films. He also wrote the story and dialogues. The film was directed by G. R. Rao. C. V. Moorthi was in charge of cinematography while the editing was done by M. Jagannathan and S. Thanu. Art direction was by C. Raghavan. Choreography was handled by Chopra, V. Madhavan and Rajkumar. K. G. Velappan did the still photography. The film was shot at Majestic Studios and was processed at Madras Cine Lab.

Soundtrack 
The Music was composed by K. V. Mahadevan while the lyrics were penned by A. Maruthakasi, Velsamy Kavi, Kannadasan, A. S. Narayanan and Kovai Kumaradevan. Singer is T. R. Mahalingam and the Playback singers are T. M. Soundararajan, A. L. Raghavan, S. C. Krishnan, Jikki, L. R. Eswari and K. Jamuna Rani.

References

External links 
 

1960 drama films
1960 films
1960s Tamil-language films
Films scored by K. V. Mahadevan
Indian drama films